The Phoenix election riot occurred on November 8, 1898, near Greenwood County, South Carolina, when a group of local white Democrats attempted to stop a Republican election official from taking the affidavits of African Americans who had been denied the ability to vote. The race-based riot was part of numerous efforts by white conservative Democrats to suppress voting by blacks, as they had largely supported the Republican Party since the Reconstruction era. Beginning with Mississippi in 1890, and South Carolina in 1895, southern states were passing new constitutions and laws designed to disenfranchise blacks by making voter registration and voting more difficult. 

The riot started after white land-owner Thomas Tolbert began to take affidavits of African Americans who had been disenfranchised by the new Constitution of South Carolina. Tolbert, brother of Republican candidate Robert R. Tolbert, hoped to use the affidavits to challenge the constitutional provisions that had formalized a previously informal disfranchisement. On November 8, 1898, Thomas Tolbert stood at the entrance of the Watson and Lake general store and began to collect the affidavits. A group of local Democrats led by J. I. "Bose" Ethridge approached the store and began to beat and terrorize him.

Over the following four days, an estimated twelve African Americans were fatally shot or lynched, hundreds more were injured by the white mob, and one white man was killed. Thomas Tolbert's home, property and personal belongings were all burned.

Background 
Race riots in the United States during this time was not uncommon, as many ethnic, political and social barriers were established between ethnic groups. Between the periods of 1700-1890s roughly 45 race riots took place. A few examples of the riots that occurred during this period includes:
 1831: Slave rebellion of slaves and free blacks (Southampton County, Virginia)
 1835: Five Points Riot (New York City)
 1863: Detroit race riot
 1863: New York City Draft Riot
 1870: New York City orange riot
 1894: Buffalo, New York riot of 1894
 1898: Wilmington race riot
 1898: Greenwood County, South Carolina
The riots of the late 1800s, although provoked by a different cause, were related to the South's widespread efforts to disenfranchise blacks in the period following the Reconstruction period. 

In 1877, the Federal Government withdrew its troops from the South, giving up its efforts to enforce the rights of freedmen and ensure their enfranchisement. Conservative white Democrats completed their takeover of state governments, although blacks continued to elect some persons to office through the century. This change in policy resulted in African-American disfranchisement, social, educational and employment discrimination, and peonage. Deprived of civil and human rights, African Americans were reduced to a status of quasi-slavery or "second-class" citizenship. A tense atmosphere of racial hatred, ignorance, and fear bred lawless mass violence, murder, and lynching. To ensure and enforce blacks' second-class status, white Democrats enacted segregation and Jim Crow laws throughout the South. During the period of the late 19th and early 20th centuries, lynchings reached a peak in the South. Florida led the nation in lynchings per capita from 1900-1930.

During the late 19th and early 20th centuries, lynching was the practice of murder through extrajudicial actions. Most commonly, the victims of lynching were African-American men: between the time periods of 1882-1968, black Americans made up 72.7% of all people lynched.

Thomas Tolbert 
Although the causes of the riot are still studied, the initial outbreak was a result of the heightened political and racial tensions. The parties were largely race-based, and conservative white Democrats were determined to ensure that black Republicans were excluded from voting and from offices. They had used fraud and violence for years to suppress black Republican voting. 

Thomas Tolbert, a white man, believed that African Americans deserved the right to vote, and disagreed with their disenfranchisement by the South Carolina State Constitution.

Events 
November 8, 1898, at around 9:00 in the morning, Thomas Tolbert joined African Americans (and Republicans) Joe Circuit, Will White and others outside of the polling place at Watson and Lake general store. They encouraged African Americans to submit affidavits if they encountered difficulty voting. Tolbert had hoped to use the affidavits to expose the ongoing electoral fraud that had deprived African Americans of the vote for the past twenty-two years. Tolbert and his followers were quickly approached by a group of local Democrats, including J. I. Ethridge, the local Democratic Party boss. Ethridge and Robert Cheatham asked Tolbert to stop what he was doing. When he refused, they overturned the box that he had been using to collect the affidavits with and began to beat him with the splintered wood and other various materials. Tolbert hit Ethridge over the head with a wagon axle.

During the altercation, William White, one of Tolbert's followers, was pushed to the ground. He may have picked up a shotgun and fired the first shot, fatally shooting J.I Ethridge, who died immediately. Ethridge's followers immediately attacked Tolbert and his supporters. Other white voters at the store joined the altercation and used their own guns against Tolbert and his group. 

During the riot, Tolbert sustained gunshot wounds to the neck, arms, and his left side. He retreated.

Aftermath 
Immediately after the riot, whites accused many black men of being involved in the violence. An uneasy peace spread over Greenwood county, as residents grappled with what had happened, and feared more violence. 

When the news got out, conservative whites started going to Greenwood to avenge Ethridge's death. Groups of armed whites scourged the countryside and nearby areas in search of victims. The group drove the Tolbert family from their home, which they destroyed and burned, along with all of the family's personal possessions. The white mob lynched four black men near the local Rehoboth Church. 

On November 11, Robert Tolbert, Thomas's brother, met with President McKinley at the White House to seek redress. The next day's issue of the New York Times reported that "the president listened attentively to the recital, but gave no indication of what action, if any, might be taken."

Wilmington insurrection 

Following the Phoenix Election Riot, a white insurgent group overthrew the elected biracial fusionist government, including a white mayor, of the city of Wilmington, North Carolina. They precipitated the Wilmington insurrection of 1898. The Democrats in the state had also been working to oust the state's Republican and populist biracial fusion government from power. The insurrection resulted in roughly 25 African Americans murdered and countless more injured by a white mob that roamed the city, attacking blacks.

Democratic party white supremacists overthrew the newly elected fusionist white mayor and biracial council. The mob of around 2,000 whites took to the streets and attacked the mainly black newspaper, Daily Record. The core group of insurgents already had assigned officeholders to the city's elected positions. Many African Americans left Wilmington permanently, although it had long been a majority-black city.

See also
 List of incidents of civil unrest in the United States

References

Further reading 
 

White American riots in the United States
Riots and civil disorder in South Carolina
Racially motivated violence against African Americans
November 1898 events
1898 in South Carolina
1898 riots
History of racism in South Carolina
Political riots in the United States